This is a list of owners and executives of the Chicago Cubs.

Owners
William Hulbert
Albert Spalding
Jim Hart
Charles Murphy
Charles Phelps Taft
Charles Weeghman
Albert Lasker
William Wrigley, Jr.
Philip K. Wrigley
William Wrigley III
Tribune Company
The Ricketts Family

General Managers
The Cubs have had 13 general managers. The general manager controls player transactions, hiring and firing of the coaching staff, and negotiates with players and agents regarding contracts. The first person to officially hold the title of general manager for the Cubs was Charles Weber, who assumed the title in 1934.

Presidents
David Allen Gage
Norman T. Gassette
George W. Gage
William Hulbert
Albert Spalding
Jim Hart
Charles Murphy
Charles H. Thomas
Charles Weeghman
Fred Mitchell
William Veeck, Sr.
Philip K. Wrigley
William Wrigley III
Bob Kennedy
Bill Hagenah
Andrew J. McKenna
Jim Finks
Dallas Green
Donald Grenesko
Andy MacPhail
John McDonough
Crane Kenney
Theo Epstein
Jed Hoyer

References

External links
Baseball America: Executive Database

 
 
Chicago Cubs
Owners And Executives